Events from the year 1666 in Ireland.

Incumbent
Monarch: Charles II

Events
February – William Penn moves from London to Ireland to manage his father's estates. In May, he is involved in suppressing a mutiny in the English garrison at Carrickfergus.
The Parliament of Ireland meets for the last time until 1692 (apart from the Patriot Parliament of 1689).
Lord Maurice Roche of Castletownroche in County Cork loses his entire estate to Lieutenant Colonel John Widenham who receives the Castle as a reward for his loyalty to the Crown. The Castle of the Roches is thus renamed "Castle Widenham".

Births
Approximate date – Richard Pockrich, landowner, military commander and politician (d.1719)

Deaths
August – Richard Burke, 6th Earl of Clanricarde, peer.
December 1 – Sir James Ware, historian, politician and Auditor general for Ireland (b.1594)
Sir Oliver Óge French, Galway merchant.
Raymond Caron, O.M.R., Franciscan friar and writer (b.1605)
Approximate date – Thomas Arthur, physician (b.1593)

References

 
1660s in Ireland
Ireland
Years of the 17th century in Ireland